A national lidar dataset refers to a high-resolution lidar dataset comprising most—and ideally all—of a nation’s terrain. Datasets of this type typically meet specified quality standards and are publicly available for free (or at nominal cost) in one or more uniform formats from government or academic sources. National LiDAR datasets are used primarily in topographic mapping, and also for forestry, urban and rural planning, recreational, environmental, engineering, and geological studies and planning, among others.

Countries with national lidar datasets either completed or in progress include:

See also
Digital elevation model
National Elevation Dataset
Remote sensing
Topography

Geographic data and information by country
Lidar